There Is No Evil is a 2020 Persian-language drama film directed and written by Mohammad Rasoulof. Banned in Iran, the film relates four stories concerning the death penalty in Iran. It had its world premiere at the 70th Berlin International Film Festival, where it won the Golden Bear.

Plot 
The film relates four stories involving capital punishment in Iran.

Cast
Credits adapted from the film's ending cedits.

Episode I
 Ehsan Mirhosseini as Heshmat
 Shaghayegh Shourian as Razieh
Episode II
 Kaveh Ahangar as Pouya
 Alireza Zareparast as Hasan
 Salar Khamseh as Salar
 Kaveh Ebrahim as Amir
 Reza Bahrami as Ali
 Darya Moghbeli as Tahmineh
Episode III
 Mohammad Valizadegan as Javad
 Mahtab Servati as Nana
 Anahita Eghbalnejad as Nana's Mother
 Hassan Tasiri as Nana's Father
Episode IV
 Mohammad Seddighimehr as Bahram
 Jila Shahi as Zaman
 Baran Rasoulof as Darya

Themes
Rasoulof explained that the film is about "people taking responsibility" for their actions, and that each story "is based on my own experience".

Production
There Is No Evil was directed by Mohammad Rasoulof. Recorded secretly, the film is banned from being shown in Iran.

Release
The film was shown at the Berlin Film Festival in February 2020.

Farhang Foundation and the UCLA Film & Television Archive released There Is No Evil online from 14 May to 10 June 2021, and it was shown at the Sydney Film Festival, Australia, in November 2021.

Accolades
It won the Golden Bear at the 70th Berlin International Film Festival in February 2020.
Sydney Film Prize, November 2021 

The director is jailed and banned from leaving Iran, so was not able to attend competitions or receive awards.

References

External links
 
 
 

2020 films
2020 drama films
German drama films
Czech drama films
Iranian drama films
2020s Persian-language films
Films about capital punishment
Films shot in Tehran
Golden Bear winners
Film controversies in Iran